Jubbayn is a Syrian town located in the Karnaz Subdistrict of the Mahardah District in Hama Governorate. According to the Syria Central Bureau of Statistics (CBS), Jubbayn had a population of 3,488 in the 2004 census.

References 

Populated places in Mahardah District